Tranipsi or Tranipsai is the name of a Thracian tribe. They are mentioned by Xenophon.

References

See also
Thracian tribes

Ancient tribes in Thrace
Thracian tribes